Nivaldo Alves Freitas Santos (born 10 July 1988), known as Nivaldo, is a Cape Verdean professional footballer who plays as a left midfielder and left back for Académica.

Club career
Born in São Nicolau, Nivaldo started playing football in his country with Batuque FC. Aged 18, he moved to Portugal to complete his development, joining Académica de Coimbra for his last year as a junior. From ages 19–23, Nivaldo competed solely in the Portuguese third division, representing C.F. Caniçal, C.D. Fátima, G.D. Ribeirão and G.D. Tourizense.

On 16 August 2011, Nivaldo returned to Académica and thus moved straight into the Primeira Liga, signing a three-year contract with the Students. He made his debut in the competition on 12 September by coming in as a 62nd-minute substitute in a 4–0 home win against C.D. Nacional, but spent most of his two-year spell with the side as understudy to Hélder Cabral.  He moved to the Czech Republic in summer 2013, joining FK Teplice. In January 2016, after a brief spell in the Belarusian Premier League, he returned to his previous club.

Honours
Académica
Taça de Portugal: 2011–12

References

External links

1988 births
Living people
Cape Verdean footballers
Association football defenders
Association football midfielders
Batuque FC players
Primeira Liga players
Segunda Divisão players
C.D. Fátima players
G.D. Ribeirão players
G.D. Tourizense players
Associação Académica de Coimbra – O.A.F. players
Czech First League players
FK Teplice players
Belarusian Premier League players
FC Dinamo Minsk players
Liga I players
Liga II players
CS Concordia Chiajna players
Anadia F.C. players
Cape Verde international footballers
2013 Africa Cup of Nations players
2015 Africa Cup of Nations players
Cape Verdean expatriate footballers
Expatriate footballers in Portugal
Expatriate footballers in the Czech Republic
Expatriate footballers in Belarus
Expatriate footballers in Romania
Cape Verdean expatriate sportspeople in Portugal
Cape Verdean expatriate sportspeople in the Czech Republic
Cape Verdean expatriate sportspeople in Belarus
Cape Verdean expatriate sportspeople in Romania